Konstantin Fyodorovich Yuon or Juon (– April 11, 1958) was a noted Russian painter and theatre designer associated with the Mir Iskusstva. Later, he co-founded the Union of Russian Artists and the Association of Artists of Revolutionary Russia.

Biography
Yuon was born in Moscow to the family of a banking clerk of Swiss-Russian origin (the surname Juon being of Walser origin). His brother Paul Juon was a notable composer.

From 1892 to 1898 he studied at the Moscow School of Painting, Sculpture and Architecture where Konstantin Savitsky and Konstantin Korovin were among his distinguished teachers. After graduating from the Moscow Art School he took private lessons from Valentin Serov (1898–1900). During several trips to Western Europe, particularly in Paris, he became acquainted with the cityscapes of Camille Pissarro and other Impressionists, but retained his own distinctive style.

In 1900 he opened the first private painting and drawing school in Moscow. Some noted Russian painters received art education in the school (for example, Olga Zhekulina). Later he taught in Leningrad Academy of Arts and the Surikov Art Institute in Moscow. His studio in Moscow was widely used by other painters. He designed sets for plays at the Moscow Art Theatre and the Maly Theater, becoming the official designer for this theater from 1945 to 1947. He also contributed sets for operas.

In the Soviet era, Yuon was the director of the Research Institute of the Academy of Arts (1948–1950) and the First Secretary of the Union of Soviet Artists (1956–1958). He won a Stalin Prize (1943), received the Order of Lenin and other orders and medals. He died in Moscow on April 11, 1958.

Selected works
Konstantin Yuon started as an Impressionist landscape and genre painter with a Symbolist note. Among the impressionist landscapes are To the Trinity (1903) and Tverskoy Boulevard (1909). Later he toyed with the ideas of lyrical landscape mixed with the imitations of Palekh miniature and Icon arts. The most Symbolist of his works are the cycle of engravings Creation of the World on the theme of Genesis (1908–1912) and the painting New Planet that shows the October Revolution as the result of a cosmic catastrophe. To the end of his life he became a strict socialist realism artist, producing paintings like Parade on the Red Square on November 7, 1941.

See also
 List of Russian artists

References

External links
Biography and art samples

1875 births
1958 deaths
Russian Impressionist painters
Artists from Moscow
19th-century painters from the Russian Empire
Russian male painters
20th-century Russian painters
Soviet painters
Full Members of the USSR Academy of Arts
Stalin Prize winners
Russian people of Swiss descent
Russian people of German descent
Recipients of the Order of Lenin
Soviet people of Swiss descent
Moscow School of Painting, Sculpture and Architecture alumni